Abigaba Cuthbert Mirembe (born 24 May 1975) is a Ugandan politician and engineer. He represents Kibale County, Kamwenge District in the parliament of Uganda. He was elected on the ticket of National Resistance Movement in 2017.

In the eleventh parliament, he serves on Committee on Education and Sports.

Early life and education
Abigaba Cuthbert Mirembe was born on 24 May 1975 to Charles Mirembe and his wife in Kabale District. His father was a teacher while his mother was a housewife.

References

Living people
1975 births
National Resistance Movement politicians
Members of the Parliament of Uganda
Makerere University alumni
University of Kiel alumni
21st-century Ugandan politicians